This article is a list of historic places in the province of Quebec entered on the Canadian Register of Historic Places, whether they are federal, provincial, or municipal. All addresses are Quebec, Canada.

List of historic places by administrative regions:

 Region 01: List of historic places in Bas-Saint-Laurent
 Region 02: List of historic places in Saguenay-Lac-Saint-Jean
 Region 03: List of historic places in Capitale-Nationale
 Region 04: List of historic places in Mauricie
 Region 05: List of historic places in Estrie
 Region 06: List of historic places in Montréal
 Region 07: List of historic places in Outaouais
 Region 08: List of historic places in Abitibi-Témiscamingue
 Region 09: List of historic places in Côte-Nord
 Region 10: List of historic places in Nord-du-Québec
 Region 11: List of historic places in Gaspésie-Îles-de-la-Madeleine
 Region 12: List of historic places in Chaudière-Appalaches
 Region 13: List of historic places in Laval
 Region 14: List of historic places in Lanaudière
 Region 15: List of historic places in Laurentides
 Region 16: List of historic places in Montérégie
 Region 17: List of historic places in Centre-du-Québec

Notes

See also 

 List of National Historic Sites of Canada in Quebec
 List of historic places in Quebec City
 Répertoire du patrimoine culturel du Québec